Peyonine is a beta-phenethylpyrrole made by Lophophora.

External links
 Peyote alkaloids. IV. Structure of peyonine, novel beta-phenethylpyrrole from Lophophora williamsii

Alkaloids
Lophophora